Metropol Cafe is a Turkish sitcom produced by Cine 5.

Its creator and writer is Birol Guven. Actors in the cast are  Nigar Alkan, Moiz Meseri, Aslı Tatar, Bade İşcil, İnan Güngören, İbrahim Tokdağ, Ali Tirkeş, Yağız Küçükemre, Celal Karakaş, Güliz Onursal, Mehmet Ergin Balkaş and Özlem Işık.

External links
 https://web.archive.org/web/20080730163345/http://www.cine5.com.tr/ (Program Website)

Turkish comedy television series